Kingdom Two Crowns is a 2018 strategy game developed by Noio and Coatsink and published by Raw Fury. The third entry in the Kingdom series, it was released on December 11, 2018 for Windows, macOS, PlayStation 4, Nintendo Switch, and Xbox One, and later for iOS and Android on April 28, 2020. In the game, players control a mounted monarch as they attempt to defend their kingdom from monsters called the Greed. The monarch can recruit villagers that perform certain jobs, while building defenses such as towers and walls to protect against increasing waves of Greed attacking the kingdom at night. Kingdom Two Crowns features single-player and cooperative multiplayer, with cooperative play enabling two monarchs to join via a split-screen.

The developers originally intended for the game to act as an expansion of its predecessor Kingdom: New Lands. As the expansion grew in size, the team decided to instead release it as a separate title. Series creator Thomas "Noio" van den Berg wanted to develop a new experience centered around defending structures, and decided to reduce the difficulty of the previous games' roguelike mechanics. The pixel art style was mainly used to cut time between drawing and implementing new designs in gameplay, with van den Berg particularly liking it for its impressionism. Kingdom Two Crowns received generally positive reviews for its strategic gameplay, artwork, and co-operative play, while also earning some criticism for its slow pacing. The game attracted over 300,000 players within six months of launch, and was supported by Raw Fury with a number of updates and expansions.

Gameplay

Kingdom Two Crowns is a 2D strategy and resource management game presented from a side-scrolling perspective. Players control a mounted monarch who must build their kingdom, and defend it from monsters called the Greed. Gameplay takes place across a day-night cycle, with the monarch exploring and building during the day, and fighting the Greed at night. Expansion is facilitated by spending gold coins, which the monarch collects and stores inside a bag. Located outside the kingdom are a number of camps, where the monarch can spend coins to hire new subjects. Once recruited, villagers remain idle until the monarch buys equipment for them, leading them to perform a specific job. Typical jobs include builders who clear land and construct defenses, farmers that grow crops for gold, or archers that hunt animals for coin and attack enemies. 

The kingdom is located in the center of the procedurally generated level, and at night, the Greed attack it from the left and right. Monarchs have no means of self-defense, but can spend coins to build walls, construct towers, and hire archers to hold off the increasing waves of enemies. If the villagers are not protected by walls, they can have their coins and equipment stolen by the Greed, and must be recruited again. Furthermore, the Greed can take coins from the monarch, and if the player has no remaining coins, the Greed can steal the monarch's crown, causing a game over. Unlike previous entries in the series, the kingdom is not destroyed if the crown is lost. Instead, the player continues as an "heir" to their partially destroyed realm.  

As the monarch explores, they can encounter portals that spawn Greed, and treasure chests containing coins or gems. Gems are used to purchase upgrades for the kingdom, such as mounts that the monarch can ride on, hermits that can be hired to make new buildings, or statues that provide benefits for the kingdom's subjects. Additionally, each level has a shipwreck that the monarch can repair, allowing for passage between the game's five island levels. As the monarch expands their kingdom across the islands, they can discover and unlock new technologies that allow for the construction of better defenses and buildings. Eventually, the technological improvements will allow the monarch to create a bomb, which is used to destroy the source of the Greed; a portal located at the far end of each level. The monarch must assemble an army to attack and destroy the portal, with their goal being the extermination of the Greed on all five islands.

Kingdom Two Crowns can be played in single-player, or through the new feature of cooperative multiplayer, in which two monarchs can join via a split-screen. In cooperative multiplayer, both players act independently, and can share their coins by throwing them at each other. In addition, if one of the monarchs loses their crown, they lose the ability to build, but can continue collecting coins for the other player. A game over only occurs if both crowns are lost.

Development
Kingdom Two Crowns was originally designed to be an expansion to Kingdom: New Lands, an improved version of the 2015 video game Kingdom. As the expansion grew and experienced numerous delays, the designers chose to develop it into a new game. In contrast to the other titles in the series, Two Crowns was mainly designed by Raw Fury co-founder Gordon van Dyke, with series creator Thomas "Noio" van den Berg acting as a creative director. Both developers wanted to create a new experience focused on defending structures instead of "defeating and escaping". They were inspired by the descendants narrative of Infinity Blade to reduce the difficulty of the original Kingdom roguelike design. As a result, the developers allowed the player to keep most of their buildings after losing their crown, believing that it would encourage them to keep playing.

Van Dyke described the art of Two Crowns as "modern pixel art aesthetics; Inspired by retro video games, but without the limitations of that era". Van den Berg liked the style for its impressionism, and chose it because it could be quickly produced, despite having some trouble designing the fonts and rotating images. The level design was particularly difficult, as van den Berg found that the "one-dimensional" layout limited player strategy. Although he was previously opposed to adding a new currency, the rest of the team convinced van den Berg to add gems, without complicating the existing gameplay.

In 2019, van den Berg sold the rights to the Kingdom franchise to Raw Fury for an undisclosed fee. He had been transitioning control of the series to Raw Fury over the course of three years, and decided to begin working on other projects. Van Dyke became the new manager of the franchise, after working as a designer on the previous games. By then, the series had sold over 4 million copies, and Kingdom Two Crowns had gained over 300,000 players within six months of launch. Raw Fury created a franchise "roadmap" for upcoming expansions and games. The studio said in 2020 that it was one of their main priorities supporting Two Crowns, and they would be providing it with further content updates.

Marketing and release 
The game was teased at PAX West in 2017, where the developers demonstrated the new mechanic of multiplayer. Raw Fury also featured a demo at the Game Developers Conference in 2018. In November of that year, the release date was officially announced alongside the addition of a new campaign "setting" called Kingdom Two Crowns: Shogun. The developers said that Shogun was the first of a number of settings, which would all contain new environments, strategies and characters. The Shogun setting was Japan-themed, and allowed for players to recruit new units such as ninjas. Kingdom Two Crowns was released on December 11, 2018 for Windows, macOS, PlayStation 4, Nintendo Switch, and Xbox One.

An update introducing "Challenge Islands" was released on September 2, 2019, adding three new islands and a mount. Versions for iOS and Android were released on April 28, 2020 alongside another free setting called Kingdom: Dead Lands. The update acted as a crossover with the 2019 metroidvania game Bloodstained: Ritual of the Night, and in it, players could switch between four Bloodstained-themed monarchs possessing their own unique abilities. The setting was conceived after the developers met Bloodstained publisher 505 Games at an indie game convention, and were inspired to create a campaign similar in design to a Halloween event that occurred annually in Kingdom: New Lands. Another free update dubbed "Never Alone" was released on April 20, 2021, introducing co-op to the Challenge Islands and adding a new one called "Trade Routes". A paid DLC called Kingdom Two Crowns: Norse Lands developed by Raw Fury and Stumpy Squid was released on November 16 alongside a free patch. The DLC added a new campaign, a type of Greed, and Norse-themed jobs and mounts. The soundtrack for Norse Lands was composed by the Norwegian alt-pop group Kalandra, with the composers drawing heavily upon Scandinavian and Celtic influences and utilizing instruments such as the hurdy-gurdy and moraharpa.

Reception 

According to the review aggregate website Metacritic, the Switch version of Kingdom Two Crowns received "generally favorable reviews". Critics frequently praised the strategic elements of gameplay. Nintendo World Report called the game "a worthy sequel" and recommended it to fans of the strategy genre, while Push Square said that it was "well-refined" and "brilliantly simple". GameStar praised the minimalism in how the monarch was controlled, and found its strategy elements to be "amazingly complex". Other critics considered the game to be substantially similar to Kingdom: New Lands, but said that it was generally better in comparison.

The introduction of co-op was received positively, with critics feeling as though it made gameplay easier. Nintendo Life considered co-op to be a helpful addition, but said players would feel like they were "almost gaming the system" after performing worse in single-player. Nintendo World Report noted that adding a second monarch allowed for players to split their attention between multiple areas, calling it an "amazingly powerful" addition. On the other hand, GameRevolution felt that the cooperative mode encouraged players to win in an "exploitative way", and that multiplayer undermined the game's "emotional impact" and "took away from the core" of the franchise.

Reviewers such as Push Square and Nintendo Life felt that the game's pacing was sedate, and would not appeal to everyone. Kotaku felt that the slow pace suited the game world, but might become frustrating when a player has to rebuild after a setback. Push Square also criticized the game's mysteries as difficult to learn. Other commentators paid specific attention to the art style. Nintendo World Report and Nintendo Life singled out the pixel art, both calling it "beautiful". Nintendo Life also highlighted that scenery changed from day to night, saying that it would "grow" on players with its "tranquility".

Notes

References

External links
 

2018 video games
Android (operating system) games
IOS games
MacOS games
Multiplayer and single-player video games
Nintendo Switch games
PlayStation 4 games
Raw Fury games
Strategy games
Windows games
Xbox One games